Opheodesoma is a genus of sea cucumbers in the family Synaptidae.

Species
The World Register of Marine Species lists the following species :

Opheodesoma australiensis  Heding, 1931
Opheodesoma clarki  Heding, 1928
Opheodesoma glabra  (Semper, 1867)
Opheodesoma grisea  (Semper, 1867)
Opheodesoma lineata  Heding, 1928
Opheodesoma radiosa  (Lesson, 1830)
Opheodesoma serpentina  (J. Müller, 1850)
Opheodesoma sinevirga  Cherbonnier, 1988
Opheodesoma spectabilis  Fisher, 1907
Opheodesoma variabilis  Heding, 1928

References

Holothuroidea genera
Synaptidae